This Rebel Breed is a 1960 American melodrama film directed by Richard L. Bare and William Rowland and starring Rita Moreno, Gerald Mohr, Eugene Martin, Dyan Cannon, and Richard Rust.

The film is also known under the titles of Lola's Mistake (American reissue title), The Black Rebels (American alternative title) and Three Shades of Love (American reissue title).

Plot 
The film tells the story of two policemen who go undercover to defeat narcotics trafficking among high school gangs. The film features stark scenes of violence between inter-racial gangs.

Cast

Release 
The film was initially released to theaters on May 4, 1960, under the title This Rebel Breed.  Producer William Rowland chose to re-release the film five years later after inserting scenes of nudity under the titles Lola's Mistake, The Black Rebels, and Three Shades of Love.

Reception 
The New York Times reviewed the film, writing that "Advertised as an unvarnished story of race prejudice and discrimination among teen-agers, "This Rebel Breed" substitutes action for insight but maintains enough excitement to place it a cut or two above the usual sensationalized products of the genre." TV Guide gave This Rebel Breed one star, stating that it "takes a disturbingly naive approach to its subject matter: pushers peddle their wares to six-year-olds, and Damon is obviously wearing makeup so the audience will know he is part black." AllMovie was similarly critical.

James V. D'arc has noted that the film was panned by Variety upon its initial release for what they saw as explicit scenes of violence and racism.

References

External links 

1960 films
1960 crime drama films
1960s gang films
American black-and-white films
American crime drama films
American gang films
American teen drama films
Films about drugs
Films about race and ethnicity
Films directed by Richard L. Bare
Films scored by David Rose
Warner Bros. films
1960s English-language films
1960s American films